Tromsøbreen is a glacier in Sørkapp Land at Spitsbergen, Svalbard. It has a length of about six kilometers, and extends southwards from the ice field of Hedgehogfonna towards the sea. The glacier is named after the Norwegian city of Tromsø.

References

Glaciers of Spitsbergen